Nurul Huq Choudhury was a Member of the 2nd, 3rd and 4th National Assembly of Pakistan as a representative of East Pakistan.

Career
Choudhury was a Member of the 2nd National Assembly of Pakistan. He served as the Minister of Central Public Works Department. He was a Member of the 3rd and 4th National Assembly of Pakistan representing Dinajpur-I.

References

Pakistani MNAs 1955–1958
Living people
People of East Pakistan
Year of birth missing (living people)
Pakistani MNAs 1962–1965
Pakistani MNAs 1965–1969